The 2022 United States Senate election in Missouri was held on November 8, 2022, concurrently with elections for all other Class 3 U.S. senators and elections for the U.S. House of Representatives, to select a member of the United States Senate to represent the state of Missouri. Incumbent Republican Senator Roy Blunt announced that he would not seek reelection to a third term in office. Missouri Attorney General Eric Schmitt won the election to succeed him. 

Anheuser-Busch heiress Trudy Busch Valentine won the Democratic primary. John Wood, a former Bush administration official and a January 6 Committee investigator, announced that he would run for the seat as an independent on June 29, but he withdrew from the race after former Missouri Governor Eric Greitens lost the Republican primary to Schmitt. Schmitt subsequently won the election, albeit by a slightly reduced margin from Trump in 2020, though also far greater than by the percentage Blunt defeated Jason Kander 6 years prior.

Republican primary

Candidates

Nominee 
Eric Schmitt, Missouri Attorney General (2019–2023) and former Missouri State Treasurer (2017–2019)

Eliminated in primary 
Robert Allen
Russel Pealer Breyfogle Jr., retired social worker
Dennis Lee Chilton, 2018 Missouri House of Representatives candidate
Eric Greitens, former Governor of Missouri (2017–2018)
C. W. Gardner, doorman and former broadcaster
Rickey Joiner, barber and business owner
Patrick A. Lewis, union construction laborer
Darrell Leon McClanahan III, political activist
Mark McCloskey, attorney and 2020 Republican National Convention speaker known for his involvement in the St. Louis gun-toting controversy
Eric McElroy, comedian and U.S. Navy veteran
Bernie Mowinsk, retired U.S. Air Force sergeant and perennial candidate
Robert Olson
Deshon Porter, host of The Big D Zone
Dave Schatz, president pro tempore of the Missouri Senate (2019–2023), state senator (2015–2023)
Kevin C. Schepers
Dave Sims, Monett public works employee and former radio host
Hartford Tunnell, college professor
Curtis D. Vaughn, valet parking attendant and liquor salesman

Missed filing deadline 
 John Brinkmann, insurance agency owner and financial consultant
 Rik Combs, Retired U.S. Air Force Officer and Libertarian nominee for Governor of Missouri in 2020
 Jeremy Gundel, farmer and write-in candidate for Lieutenant Governor of Missouri in 2020

Withdrew 
 Roy Blunt, incumbent U.S. Senator (2011–2023) and Chair of the Senate Republican Policy Committee (2019–2023)
Dan McQueen, former mayor of Corpus Christi, Texas (2016–2017) (ran for the U.S. House)

Declined
Jay Ashcroft, Missouri Secretary of State (2017–present)
 Scott Fitzpatrick, Missouri State Treasurer (2019–2023) (ran for state auditor)
Timothy A. Garrison, former U.S. Attorney for the Western District of Missouri (2018–2021)
Mike Kehoe, Lieutenant Governor of Missouri (2018–present) (ran for governor)
Peter Kinder, former Lieutenant Governor of Missouri (2005–2017)
Mike Parson, Governor of Missouri (2018–present)
Kathy Swan, former state representative (2012–2021)

Endorsements 
The day before the primary, former president Donald Trump released a statement endorsing "ERIC". There were three candidates with the first name Eric running in the Republican primary: Eric Greitens, Eric McElroy, and Eric Schmitt. Trump's statement did not offer any clarification on whether this was an endorsement for one or multiple candidates, and when reached for comment by NBC News, Trump's office declined to clarify the endorsement, saying it "speaks for itself". However, Politico reported it as an endorsement for both Greitens and Schmitt, as Trump had apparently expressed indecision on which of the two men to back before a dual endorsement was suggested; he separately contacted both candidates to pledge his support, and both subsequently claimed the endorsement as being for them.

Debates

Polling
Graphical summary

Results

Democratic primary 

As the Democratic primary progressed, three main contenders emerged; Lucas Kunce, director of national security at the American Economic Liberties Project, Spencer Toder, a businessman, and Trudy Busch Valentine, heiress of the Anheuser-Busch brewing company. Kunce and Toder both campaigned as anti-establishment populists, whereas Valentine campaigned in a staid manner with few public appearances.

Candidates

Nominee 
Trudy Busch Valentine, retired nurse and daughter of beer magnate August Busch Jr.

Eliminated in primary
Ron Harris, truck driver, U.S. Air Force veteran, and perennial candidate
Jewel Kelly, real estate agent and U.S. Air Force veteran
Pat Kelly, environmental engineer and patent attorney
Lucas Kunce, national security director of the American Economic Liberties Project and retired U.S. Marine Corps officer
Lewis Rolen, medical operational assistant
Josh Shipp, physical therapy technician and candidate for Missouri's 1st congressional district in 2018
Clay Taylor
Spencer Toder, entrepreneur
Carla Coffee Wright, businesswoman, actress, and perennial candidate

Withdrew 
 Tim Shepard, tech entrepreneur (endorsed Valentine)
 Scott Sifton, former state senator (2013–2021) (endorsed Valentine)

Declined
Quinton Lucas, mayor of Kansas City (2019–present)  (running for re-election in 2023)
Jay Nixon, former Governor of Missouri (2009–2017) and nominee for U.S. Senate in 1988 and 1998
Brian Williams, state senator (2019–present) (ran for re-election) 
Clint Zweifel, former Missouri State Treasurer (2009–2017)

Endorsements

Polling
Graphical summary

Results

Libertarian primary

Candidates

Nominee
 Jonathan Dine, nominee for U.S. Senate in 2012 and 2016

Results

Constitution primary

Candidates

Nominee
 Paul Venable, information technology consultant and nominee for Secretary of State in 2020

Results

Independents

Candidates

Withdrew 
 Thomas Schneider, former mayor of Florissant (2011–2019) (endorsed Schatz and Valentine)
 John Wood, former senior counsel for the United States House Select Committee on the January 6 Attack and former U.S. Attorney for the Western District of Missouri (2007–2009) and former General Counsel for the US Chamber of Commerce

Missed ballot deadline 

 Rick Seabaugh, sales manager
Nicholas Strauss, network engineer

General election

Predictions

Debates

Endorsements

Polling
Aggregate polls

Graphical summary

Eric Greitens vs. Lucas Kunce

Eric Greitens vs. Trudy Busch Valentine

Vicky Hartzler vs. Lucas Kunce

Vicky Hartzler vs. Trudy Busch Valentine

Billy Long vs. Lucas Kunce

Eric Schmitt vs. Lucas Kunce

Eric Greitens vs. Lucas Kunce vs. generic independent

Eric Greitens vs. Jay Nixon

Eric Greitens vs. Scott Sifton

Eric Greitens vs. generic Democrat

Generic Republican vs. generic Democrat

Vicky Hartzler vs. Scott Sifton

Billy Long vs. Scott Sifton

Eric Schmitt vs. Jay Nixon

Eric Schmitt vs. Scott Sifton

Roy Blunt vs. Jason Kander

Roy Blunt vs. Scott Sifton

Results

See also 
 2022 United States Senate elections
 2022 Missouri elections

Notes

Partisan clients

References

External links 
Official campaign websites
 Eric Schmitt (R) for Senate
 Trudy Busch Valentine (D) for Senate
 Paul Venable (C) for Senate

United States Senate
Missouri
2022